Gwardia Warszawa was a Polish sports club based in Warsaw. The club was founded in 1948. It participated in the Polish 1st League from 1953–1960 (8 seasons), 1962–1966 (5 seasons), 1967–1968, 1969–1975, 1978–1979 and 1981–1983. The biggest success was finishing 2nd in the Polish Championship in the 1957 season.

Gwardia Warszawa football team in Europe

Achievements
 Polish Cup:
 Winner: 1954
 Polish Cup Finalist: 1974
 Ekstraklasa:
 Runner Up: 1957
 Third Place: 1959, 1972-73
 Europe
 First Round of the 1955–56 European Cup
 Second Round of the 1974–75 European Cup Winners' Cup
 Polish U-19 Runner Up: 1960, 1978

References

External links
 Official Website

See also
 Football in Poland
 List of football teams
 Champions' Cup/League
 UEFA Cup

Association football clubs established in 1948
1948 establishments in Poland
Association football clubs disestablished in 2018
2018 disestablishments in Poland
Defunct football clubs in Poland
Gwardia Warsaw
Police association football clubs in Poland
Police sports clubs